Rev. Robert L. Niehoff, S.J. (born August 14, 1953) is the President Emeritus of John Carroll University in University Heights, Ohio.

Niehoff was appointed as the 24th president in John Carroll history on April 7, 2005, and assumed the duties of president on August 22, 2005. Prior to his service at John Carroll, he was the Associate Provost and Vice President for Planning and Budget of the University of San Francisco.

Niehoff joined the Society of Jesus in 1972 and was ordained in 1982. He has a B.A. degree in philosophy, two master's degrees in theology, an MBA at the University of Washington, and a Ph.D. at Gonzaga University.  Working on his business background, he has served as the Treasurer of the Jesuit School of Theology at Berkeley; Associate Treasurer of the Oregon Province of the Society of Jesus; Financial Officer of the Roman Catholic Archdiocese of Nassau, in the Bahamas; and Financial Analyst and Assistant to the Vice President for Student Life at Gonzaga University.

On July 1, 2017, following the longest term as president in University history, Niehoff became John Carroll's first President Emeritus.

References

Living people
20th-century American Jesuits
21st-century American Jesuits
Presidents of John Carroll University
Gonzaga University alumni
University of Washington Foster School of Business alumni
University of San Francisco faculty
1953 births